Catch My Smoke is a 1922 American silent Western film directed by William Beaudine, based on the novel Shoe-bar Stratton by Joseph Bushnell Ames. It stars
Tom Mix, Lillian Rich, and Claude Payton.

Plot
As described in a film magazine, Bob Stratton (Mix) returns from France after two years and finds his ranch in strange hands. In order to get to the bottom of affairs, he takes a job there. Mary Thorne (Rich) is running the ranch, left to her by her father who was the executor of Bob's will and, thinking Bob had bedn killed in World War I, had appropriated the place for himself. Mary's father had been mysteriously killed, and she has engaged Tex Lynch as her foreman. Tex knows the ranch has oil under it and tries to force Mary to sell it. She is captured and taken to a deserted mine, but Bob arrives on scene to affect a rescue. Together they ride back together and Bob's horse Tony approves of their match.

Cast
 Tom Mix as Bob Stratton
 Lillian Rich as Mary Thorne
 Claude Payton as Tex Lynch
 Gordon Griffith as Bub Jessup
 Harry Griffith as Al Draper
 Robert Milasch as Frank Hurd
 Pat Chrisman as Joe Bloss
 C.E. Anderson as Sheriff
 Ruby Lafayette as Mrs Archer
 Tony the Horse (uncredited)

Status
The film's status is unknown, meaning that it may be lost.

See also
 Tom Mix filmography

References

External links

 
 

1922 films
1922 Western (genre) films
American black-and-white films
Films directed by William Beaudine
Fox Film films
Silent American Western (genre) films
1920s American films
1920s English-language films